Let Your Hair Down is the seventeenth studio album by the Steve Miller Band, released on April 19, 2011.

Let Your Hair Down was recorded alongside the group's previous album, Bingo!, which was released 10 months earlier. Like Bingo!, this album is a collection of blues and R&B covers, and as of 2022, it is the Steve Miller Band's most recent studio album.

Like Bingo, the artwork was designed by StormStudios, with a plethora of visual puns used in the pictures (the cover shows a man with no hair, but a hare sitting on his head, and a small ladder at the side).

Track listing

Personnel
 Steve Miller – lead guitar, vocals
 Norton Buffalo – harmonica, vocals
 Kenny Lee Lewis – rhythm guitar, vocals
 Joseph Wooten – Hammond B-3, piano, keyboards, vocals
 Gordy Knudtson – drums
 Billy Peterson – bass guitar, vocals
 Sonny Charles – vocals

Additional personnel
 Michael Carabello – congas, percussion
 Adrian Areas – timbales, percussion

References

2011 albums
Steve Miller Band albums
Albums produced by Andy Johns
Albums with cover art by Storm Thorgerson
Covers albums